Arab Film Distribution presents films about the Arab world. The Seattle-based company distributes its films in North America, and was founded in 1990 by the Seattle Arab & Iranian Film Festival, which was in turn created for the 1990 Goodwill Games. In 2005, the company launched a theatrical subsidiary, Typecast Entertainment.

References

External links

Arab-American mass media
Arab mass media
Mass media companies established in 1990
Companies based in Seattle
Film distributors of the United States